Bzyb (also spelled Bzyp) is a major dialect of Abkhaz, native to the Bzyb River region of Caucasus.

It differs from standard Abkhaz mainly in terms of phonology. Standard Abkhaz (which is based on the Abzhywa dialect) lacks these sounds.

The Bzyb consonant inventory appears to have been the fundamental inventory of Proto-Abkhaz, with the inventories of Abzhywa and Sadz being reduced from this total, rather than the Bzyb series being innovative.

See also
Abkhaz phonology

References

Abkhaz language